Baba Gurdit Singh (25 August 1860 – 24 July 1954) was the central figure in the Komagata Maru incident of 1914, one of several incidents in the history of early 20th century involving exclusion laws in both Canada and the United States designed to keep out immigrants of only Asian origin.

Singh was born in 1860 at Sarhali, in the Amritsar District of the Punjab province in British India. In 1914 he chartered a Japanese ship, the Komagata Maru, to go to Canada, reaching Vancouver on 23 May 1914. The government did not allow the ship to anchor and the ship was attacked by the police at night. The attack was repulsed by the passengers and it created a great stir among Indians in Canada.

Early years
His grandfather, Sardar Rattan Singh was a high-ranking military officer in the Sikh Khalsa Army and had fought against the British during the First and Second Anglo-Sikh Wars.  He declined the British offer of a jagir after the annexation of the Punjab. Later on, his father Sardar Hukam Singh went to Malaya where he settled down as a contractor.

Education
Gurdit Singh received little education in his childhood, partly due to the harsh treatment of his teacher which caused him to leave school. However, at the age of 13, he privately acquired elementary education so as to be able to correspond with his father in Malaya.

British Malaya
Gurdit Singh visited Malaya in about 1885 and conducted business in Singapore and Malaya as a contractor. He returned from there in 1909. In 1911 he raised his voice against forced labour. He wrote to the government complaining against officials who forced poor villagers to work for them without remuneration, and when he received no response, he exhorted the people of his village to refuse to be subjected to begar (forced labour).

Legacy
Though he himself was a well-to-do fisherman in Singapore, Gurdit Singh chartered a Japanese ship, the Komagata Maru, in 1914 to go to Canada, with the aim of helping his compatriots whose journeys to Canada were being blocked. The government of Canada had put restrictions on the entry of Indians. 

The ship had a total of 376 passengers out of whom 351 were Sikhs and 21 Punjabi Muslims. The ship sailed from Hong Kong to Vancouver on 3 April 1914. The obstructions put up by the alien authorities and the hardships faced by its passengers turned them into staunch nationalists. The ship reached Vancouver on 22 May 1914, it was not allowed to anchor and was attacked by the police at night. The attack was repulsed by the passengers and it created a great stir among the Indians in Canada. This is known as the Komagata Maru incident. 

An agreement was reached and the ship sailed back to India. It reached Calcutta on 29 September 1914. However, the passengers were not allowed to enter Calcutta; they were rather ordered to board a Punjab-bound train especially arranged for the purpose. They refused to do so and many of the passengers were killed, though a great many escaped. 

Gurdit Singh was aware of the problems that Punjabis were facing in getting to Canada due to exclusion laws. He was apparently also aware of the January 1914 regulations when he chartered the Komagata Maru, with the purported goal of challenging the continuous journey regulation and opening the door for immigration from India to Canada. He believed he could circumvent this law by hiring a boat to sail from Calcutta to Vancouver. 

At the same time, in January 1914, he publicly espoused the Ghadarite cause while in Hong Kong. The Ghadar Party was an organisation founded by Indians of the United States and Canada in June 1913 with the aim of liberating India from British rule. It was also known as the Hindi Association of the Pacific Coast.

Later years
Baba Gurdit Singh escaped and remained underground for many years until 1920 when, on the advice of Mahatma Gandhi, he made a voluntary surrender at Nankana Sahib and was imprisoned for five years. Later, he settled in Calcutta. He died on 24 July, 1954, in Amritsar and was cremated at his native village Sarhali Kalan, Tarn taran.

In 1937, Pratap Singh Kairon, the future Chief Minister Punjab and then an Akali nominee, entered the Punjab Legislative Assembly, defeating the Congress candidate, none other than Baba Gurdit Singh of Sarhali. 

Baba Gurdit Singh had one son, Baba Balwant Singh. Baba Balwant Singh had two sons, Ajit Singh & Jaswant Singh, and five daughters: Harbhajan Kaur, Sawant Kaur, Amarjit Kaur, Balbir Kaur & Dalbir Kaur. His sons both died in late seventies and early eighties. He has two paternal grandsons, one of them lives in Zira and the other (Tejpal Singh Sandhu) lives in Canada while their mother (his daughter-in-law) is settled in the US. His grandson, living in Zira, died in 2014 in a car accident near Sarhali.

References

External links 
 Descendants of the Komagata Maru Society Website, a site dedicated to educating people about the Komagata Maru Incident 

1860 births
1954 deaths
History of human rights in Canada
Indian revolutionaries
International maritime incidents